Nicolaas Everhardus "Ewie" Cronjé (23 July 1939 – 11 May 2020) was a South African cricketer who played in 27 first-class matches between 1960 and 1972. He was the father of Hansie Cronje and Frans Cronje. He was also the president of the Free State Cricket Union from 1983 to 1990, and in 2012 he was honoured with the Khaya Majola Lifetime Award, for his services to cricket.

References

External links
 

1939 births
2020 deaths
South African cricketers
Free State cricketers
Place of birth missing